Qingzhou is a town in Heping County, Guangdong, China.

Towns in Guangdong
Heping County